Marcos Adrián Galarza (born 3 April 1984 in Morón, Buenos Aires) is an Argentine retired football defender.

Galarza made his professional debut for Banfield in 2002. He went on to make over 100 appearances for the club. in 2003 he was part of the Argentina squad that won the Pan American Games football tournament.

Honours

External links
 Argentine Primera statistics at Fútbol XXI  
 Statistics at Irish Times
 

1984 births
Living people
People from Morón Partido
Argentine people of Basque descent
Argentine footballers
Association football defenders
Club Atlético Banfield footballers
San Martín de San Juan footballers
Expatriate footballers in Israel
Hapoel Be'er Sheva F.C. players
Argentine expatriate sportspeople in Israel
Argentine Primera División players
Israeli Premier League players
Pan American Games medalists in football
Pan American Games gold medalists for Argentina
Footballers at the 2003 Pan American Games
Medalists at the 2003 Pan American Games
Sportspeople from Buenos Aires Province